Teacher's Pet may refer to:

 Teacher's pet, a phenomenon

Films
 Teacher's Pet (1930 film), a 1930 two-reel "Our Gang" comedy short
 Teacher's Pet (1958 film), a 1958 romantic comedy film
 Teacher's Pet (2004 film), a 2004 animated musical based on a 2000 TV series

Television
 Teacher's Pet (TV series), a 2000 animated series about a dog who lives like a human
 Teacher's Pet (anime), a hentai anime about a student who loves her professor

Episodes
 "Teacher's Pet" (Buffy the Vampire Slayer), 1997
 "Teacher's Pet" (The Fairly OddParents), 2010
 "Teacher's Pet" (The Following), 2014
 "Teacher's Pet" (Goosebumps), 1998
 "Teacher's Pet" (The Proud Family), 2001
 "Teacher's Pet" (That's So Raven), 2007

Music
 "Teacher's Pet" (song), a 1958 song from the film of the same name
 "Teacher's Pet", a song by The Boys
 "Teacher's Pet", a song by B5 on the album B5
 "Teacher's Pet", a song by Christy Carlson Romano on the album Greatest Disney TV & Film Hits
 "Teacher's Pet", a song by Extreme on their album Extreme
 "Teacher's Pet", a song by Melanie Martinez from her album K-12
 "Teacher's Pet", a song by Venom on the album Black Metal

Literature
 Teacher's Pet (comics), a British strip appearing in the 1970s comic book Cor!!
 Sensei no Okiniiri!, a manga by Miki Aihara, commonly referred to in English as Teacher's Pet!
 "Teacher's Pet" (short story), a 1994 story in the Goosebumps series by R. L. Stine
 Teacher's Pet, a 1986 novel by Andrew Neiderman

Other uses

 The Teacher's Pet, a podcast hosted by Australian journalist Hedley Thomas